Saghbine, is a village located in the Western Beqaa District of the Beqaa Governorate in Lebanon.

History
In 1838, Eli Smith noted  it as 'Sughbin; a  Maronite and Catholic village on the West side of the Beqaa Valley, listed after Machghara.

The origin of the name “Saghbine” is commonly related to the hardness and stubbornness of its men. However, Moufarrej, in the Lebanese Encyclopedia, states that origin of the name Saghbine is Aramaic and refers to the “rugged mountain trails”.

Location 
Saghbine town is located on the eastern slope of Western Lebanese Mountains, at the foot of Mount Niha, by the Litani River in the heart of West Bekaa.

References

Bibliography

External links
Saghbine, localiban

Populated places in Western Beqaa District